Yet is a common English word that, when used as a conjunction, is equivalent to the words "but" or "nevertheless".

However, used as an adverb, yet defines an action's persistence in time. The word can define an action in the past, present or future:

I have never yet been late.
I yet stand.
I will yet arrive.

"yet" in questions:

What do you have yet to learn?  (in the future)
Have you done it ?  <=>  Have you already done it?   (in the past)
The above use of "" is illogical, but very common and thus considered correct.

Yet, or YET, may also refer to:

YET, the IATA code for Edson Airport, Alberta, Canada
YET, the National Rail code for Yetminster railway station in Dorset, UK
"Yet" (song) by the American band Exile
Yett, sometimes spelt yet is a local dialect term in lowland Scotland and Cumbria for a reinforced door or gate

See also
Yet another